The  Washington Redskins season was the franchise's 7th season in the National Football League (NFL) and their 2nd in Washington, D.C.  The team began trying to defend their championship and improve on their 8–3 record from 1937, but failed and missed the playoffs and finished 6-3-2.

Draft

Schedule

Standings

References

Washington
Washington Redskins seasons
Washington Football Team